Sainte-Madeleine-de-la-Rivière-Madeleine is a municipality in the Gaspésie-Îles-de-la-Madeleine region of the province of Quebec in Canada.

The municipality includes the communities of Madeleine-Centre, Manche-d'Épée, and Rivière-la-Madeleine.

The community of Manche-d'Épée is home to the Manche-d'Épée Ecological Reserve.

Demographics

Population

Language

Gallery

See also
 List of municipalities in Quebec

References

Incorporated places in Gaspésie–Îles-de-la-Madeleine
Municipalities in Quebec